Battle of Independence could refer to either of the following

First Battle of Independence, a battle of the U.S. Civil War fought in Independence, Missouri on 11 August 1862 (Confederate victory);
Second Battle of Independence, a battle of the U.S. Civil War fought in the same town on 22 October 1864 (Union victory).